Steinacleit is a prehistoric archeological site on the west coast of Lewis in the Outer Hebrides of Scotland.

The site consists of an array of boulders which marks what is left of a chambered cairn, and possibly shows the site was overlain by a huge hall. There are ten large stone slabs surrounding the central mound. Folk legend of the Outer Hebrides states there was probably a battlefield near the location. The age of the site is debatable and according to different sources ranges from 1800–1500 BC or 3000–1500 BC.

The standing stone Clach an Trushal is visible to the south west from the stone circle.

External links
http://www.historic-scotland.gov.uk/properties_sites_detail.htm?propertyID=PL_274

2nd-millennium BC architecture in Scotland
Archaeological sites in the Outer Hebrides
Historic Environment Scotland properties
Prehistoric sites in Scotland
Chambered cairns in Scotland
Scheduled monuments in Scotland
Buildings and structures in the Isle of Lewis